Amos Eastman Wood (January 2, 1810 – November 19, 1850) was a U.S. Representative from Ohio from 1849 to 1850.

Biography 
Born in Ellisburg, New York, Wood attended the common schools.  He moved to Sandusky County, Ohio, in 1833 and engaged in agricultural pursuits.  He served as member of the Ohio House of Representatives 1840–1842, and served in the Ohio Senate in 1845.

Congress 
Wood was elected as a Democrat to the Thirty-first Congress to fill the vacancy caused by the death of Rodolphus Dickinson and served from December 3, 1849, until his death in Fort Wayne, Indiana, November 19, 1850.  He was interred in Woodville Cemetery, Woodville, Ohio.

See also
List of United States Congress members who died in office (1790–1899)

Sources

1810 births
1850 deaths
People from Ellisburg, New York
People from Sandusky County, Ohio
Democratic Party members of the Ohio House of Representatives
Democratic Party Ohio state senators
19th-century American politicians
Democratic Party members of the United States House of Representatives from Ohio